SREB may refer to:

The Chinese Silk Road Economic Belt, a land-based trade initiative
The Southern Regional Education Board in the USA
The Southern Regional Examinations Board in the UK, incorporated into the Oxford, Cambridge and RSA Examinations Board (OCR)
The Super Conserved Receptor Expressed in Brain family of G protein-coupled receptors